"Dream About Me" is a song by American electronica musician Moby, released as the fourth single from his 2005 studio album Hotel. As the follow-up single to "Spiders", it was released in the UK on August 8, 2005, by Mute Records. Singer-songwriter and MoveOn cultural director Laura Dawn is featured on lead vocals alongside Moby himself.

Music video 

The video for the single was produced with cutout animation and begins with a spaceship flying over a major city. The spaceship flies over a sidewalk and deposits its passengers that appear as small white kittens that are all picked up by pedestrians except for a tabby, whom none of the pedestrians desire to adopt or love. The tabby kitten then walks around and experiences the reality of the world, avoiding being stepped on, or almost falling into a storm drain and almost getting run down by cars crossing the street as well as running away from a vicious dog into an alleyway past a poster of Moby. The tabby then goes to sleep and dreams of a paradisiacal place where there is no hardship or pain. The tabby wakes up and then continues walking until it comes across a tree in the sidewalk and climbs it to the top. When it gets to the top, it appears that many spaceships are hovering over the city, indicating that, presumably, the tabby is not alone and that there may be other outcast kittens like itself, deposited in the same way throughout the world.

Track listing 

 CD (UK)

 "Dream About Me (Album Version Radio Mix)"
 "Feeling So Real (Recorded Live on the Hotel Tour in London)"

 Vinyl

 7" vinyl

 "Dream About Me"
 "Dream About Me (The Shortwave Set Pick 'n' Mix)"

 12" vinyl

 "Dream About Me (Sebastian Ingrosso Remix)"
 "Dream About Me (MHC Extended Remix)"
 "Dream About Me (Booka Shade Remix)"

Moby songs
2005 singles
Songs written by Moby
Mute Records singles
2005 songs